George Wrighte (c.1706–1766), of Gayhurst House, Buckinghamshire, and Brooksby Hall, near Leicester was a British landowner and Tory  politician who sat in the House of Commons for 39 years from 1727 to 1766.

Wrighte was the eldest surviving son  of George Wrighte of Gayhurst and Brooksby, clerk of the Crown in Chancery, and his wife Mary Bedford, daughter of Thomas Bedford of Doctors’ Commons, register of Admiralty. His grandfather was Sir Nathan Wrighte  keeper of the great seal. He was admitted to Inner Temple in 1715 and at Emmanuel College, Cambridge in 1724. In 1725, he succeeded his father to Gayhurst and Brooksby.  He married Barbara Clarges, daughter of Sir Thomas Clarges, 2nd Baronet, MP  of Aston, Hertfordshire in May 1733.
 
Wrighte was returned as a Tory Member of Parliament for Leicester on the corporation interest at the 1727 British general election. He voted consistently against the Administration. He was returned as MP again in a contest at the 1734 British general election. His only recorded speech was made on 5 May 1738 in a debate on the Spanish depredations in America, when he exonerated the Spanish government from responsibility and deprecated measures likely to provoke Spain into war.  On  the motion for the dismissal of Walpole in February 1741,  he was one of the Tories who withdrew. He was returned unopposed for Leicester in 1741 and 1747.

Wrighte was returned at Leicester on the corporation interest at the  1754 British general election after a fierce contest.  At the 1761 British general election he was returned unopposed.

Wrighte died on 27 January 1766, leaving a son George who inherited the estates and a daughter Barbara.

References

1700s births
1766 deaths
Members of the Parliament of Great Britain for English constituencies
British MPs 1727–1734
British MPs 1734–1741
British MPs 1741–1747
British MPs 1747–1754
British MPs 1754–1761
British MPs 1761–1768
Tory MPs (pre-1834)